Beverloo Camp was a military installation at Leopoldsburg (Bourg-Léopold in French), Belgium; 70 km southeast of Antwerp.

The camp was created in 1835, shortly after the independence of Belgium from the Netherlands. It acquired a permanent character in 1850. 
During World War I and World War II it was occupied by German troops. In May 1944 the camp was bombed by the Allied forces, damaging some blocks. A part of the Camp was also used as a POW-camp by the Germans.

Beverloo Soldiers' Council
The Beverloo Soldiers' Council was set up by mutinous German soldiers in November 1918 as part of the November Revolution. The first mutiny, by Alsatian soldiers occurred on 12 May 1918. They worked closely with the Brussels Soldiers' Council.

Interwar years
In 1920, the facilities hosted the pistol and rifle shooting events for the 1920 Summer Olympics. While those events took place, combat engineers detonated grenades four kilometres from the shooting stands.

For World War II, during the German occupation, following the Battle of France, 10,000 members of the Hitler Youth forming the 12th SS Panzer Division Hitlerjugend were trained at the camp. During the war, it was also used as a transit camp for the Holocaust. Josef Nassy, an American black artist of Jewish descent, was imprisoned here during World War II.

More
 Beverloo Camp Railway
 A website about the history of Leopoldsburg and Beverloo Camp: 3970Leopoldsburg.be

References

Sports-reference.com Shooting overview of the 1920 Summer Olympics.
US Holocaust Museum profile of Josef Nassy.

Specific

Venues of the 1920 Summer Olympics
Olympic shooting venues
Defunct sports venues in Belgium
Infrastructure of the Holocaust
World War II sites of Nazi Germany
World War II sites in Belgium
Sports venues in Limburg (Belgium)